Frida Sanggaard Nielsen (born 1 December 1998) is a Danish rower.

She started rowing in 2015 while an exchange student in Rockford, Michigan. Her first rowing club was Michigan's Rockford Rowing Club. Her main position is Bow.

Since moving back to her hometown in 2016, Nielsen has represented her nation at the 2016 Junior European Championships and at the 2016 Junior World Championships, where she and her JW2 rowing partner Ida Petersen finished 2nd both times, earning silver medals for Denmark. She and Petersen then earned gold in a women's fours crew with Olympic bronze medallists Hedvig Laerke Rasmussen and Anne Andersen at the 2016 Head of the Charles Regatta.

References

External links

Living people
Danish female rowers
1998 births
Rowers from Copenhagen
World Rowing Championships medalists for Denmark
Rowers at the 2020 Summer Olympics